This is a list of notable people from Dubai, United Arab Emirates.

A
 Mohammed bin Ali Al Abbar
 Dr. Ali Al Numairy
 Shahraban Abdullah
 Ahlam
Juma al Majid
Adnan Khan
Ahmad Mohammad Hasher Al Maktoum
Maitha bint Mohammed bin Rashid Al Maktoum
Ahmed bin Saeed Al Maktoum
Mohammad Al Murr
Nasser Hassan Al-Shaikh
Khalid Albudoor
Nujoom AlGhanem
Ali Rashid Lootah
Suhail Galadari
Alia bint Khalifa bin Saeed al Maktoum
Hamdan bin Rashid Al Maktoum
Ahyan Ismail

B
 Kehkashan Basu
 Ahmed Sultan Bin Sulayem
 Adi Bitar
 Brigita Brezovac
 Ahmad Bin Byat

E
 Esther Eden

F
 Fahad Alhashmi
 Adham Faramawy

G
 Saeed Mohammad Al Gandi
 Mohammad Al Gaz
 Mohammed Al Gergawi
 Wael Ghonim
 Abdul Aziz Al Ghurair
 Abdulla Al Ghurair
 Saif Ahmad Al Ghurair

H
 Diana Haddad
Hamdan bin Mohammed Al Maktoum
Mohammed Saeed Harib
Princess Haya bint Al Hussein
Mohammed Hamdan Ismail

J
 Ed Jones

K
 Abdulla Al Kamali
 Mohammed Khalfan Bin Kharbash

L
 Wedad Lootah

M
 Ahmed bin Rashid Al Maktoum
 Maktoum bin Mohammed bin Rashid Al Maktoum
 Maktoum Hasher Maktoum Al Maktoum
 Rashid bin Mohammed Al Maktoum
 Manal bint Mohammed bin Rashid Al Maktoum
 Mohammed bin Khalifa Al Maktoum
 Mohi-Din Binhendi

N
 Ghanem Nuseibeh

O
 Mohammad Omar (footballer)
 Ousha the Poet

Q
 Qasim Sultan Al Banna
 Elham Al Qasim

R
 Rashid Ahmad Muhammad Bin Fahad

S
 Saeed bin Maktoum bin Rashid Al Maktoum
 Saeed-Al-Saffar
 Hussain Sajwani
 Talal Al-Nuaimi
 Mohamed Salim
 Mai Selim
 Mohammed bin Sulayem
 Sultan Ahmed bin Sulayem
 Sultan Zarawani
 Mohamed Yehia Zakaria

References

Dubai